Dáire is an Old Irish name which fell out of use at an early period, remaining restricted essentially to legendary and ancestral figures, usually male. It has come back into fashion since the 18th century.  The anglicised form of this name is Dara.

Bearers of the name

Pre-modern world
 Dáire Barrach, a Leinster dynast and son of Cathair Mór of the Laigin
 Dáire Cerbba, a Munster dynast of the 4th century
 Dáire Derg, character from the Fenian Cycle possibly identical with Goll mac Morna
 Dáire Doimthech (Sírchréchtach), a legendary King of Tara, ancestor of the Dáirine and Corcu Loígde
 Dáire Donn, "king of the great world" from the Battle of Ventry of the Fenian Cycle
 Dáire Dornmár, a grandson of the legendary Conaire Mór and early king of Dál Riata
 Dáire Drechlethan, a King of Tara of uncertain identity listed in the Baile Chuinn Chétchathaig
 Dáire mac Cormaic, a son of the celebrated Cormac mac Airt
 Dáire mac Degad, father of the legendary Cú Roí and alternative ancestor of the Dáirine
 Dáire mac Dlúthaig, father of Fiatach Finn of the Ulaid, ancestor of the Dál Fiatach
 Dáire mac Fiachna, cattle-lord from the Ulster Cycle, owner of the Donn Cuailnge and cousin of Conchobar mac Nessa
 Dáire mac Forgo (Forggo), an early king of Emain Macha of the Ulaid and alternative father of Fiatach Finn
 Dáire of Ulster, a later king of Ulster during the reign of Lóegaire mac Néill, High King of Ireland, and allegedly visited by Saint Patrick

Modern world
 Daire Brehan (1957–2012), Irish actress, broadcaster and barrister
 Daire Doyle (born 1980), Irish assistant football manager and former player
 Daire Gray (born 1998), Irish hurler
 Daire Keogh (born 1964), Irish academic, historian and president of Dublin City University
 Daire Nolan (born 1968), Irish dancer and choreographer
 Daire O'Brien, Irish broadcaster and journalist
 Daire O'Connor (born 1997), Irish footballer
 Daire Plunkett (born 1990), Irish hurler
 Daire Quinn, Irish hurler
 Daire Rendon (born 1952), American politician

Interpretations
Both Eoin MacNeill and T. F. O'Rahilly believed that most, if not all of those listed may derive from the same prehistoric or mythological figure, or have adopted each other's features to such an extent as to all be composites. The latter states that Daire and Cú Roí "are ultimately one and the same", and refers to him as "the god of the Otherworld".

Meaning and origins
The meaning is both sexual ("fruitful, fertile, rutty") and tumultuous ("violent"). The reconstructed form is *Dārios, cognate to the Gaulish Dari(o) ("tumult, rage"), a form widely attested on the Continent, especially in personal names.

The Darini were a population group or kingdom located by Ptolemy's 2nd century Geography in south Antrim and north Down. Julius Pokorny believed this to be a mistake for Darioni, from the groundform  *Dārio-nion, reconstructed from the proto-historical Dairine, descendants of Daire Doimthech / Daire mac Dedad and ancestors of the historical Corcu Loígde. They were probably also ancestral, at least in part, to the Dál Fiatach, the descendants of Fiatach Finn mac Daire and known as the historical Ulaid (< *Uluti / Uoluntii), mentioned by Ptolemy living adjacent to the Darini.

Lugaid
 See: Lugaid for additional persons
Closely associated with Daire in Irish legend is the heroic figure Lugaid. According to O'Rahilly he was the son of Dáire, Lugaid mac Dáire or Lugaid Loígde, son of Dáire Doimthech (or Sírchrechtach), but was chiefly remembered in the person of his 'descendant' Lugaid Mac Con. His other principal emanation was Lugaid mac Con Roí, son of Cú Roí and famously known from the Ulster Cycle. In addition, the revolting Lugaid Riab nDerg has been suggested as a relation to these, or alternatively a very different individual and King of Tara once known as Lugaid Réoderg.

See also
List of Irish-language given names
 Iverni
 Deda mac Sin
 Dis Pater

Notes

References

 Xavier Delamarre, Dictionnaire de la Langue Gauloise. Paris: Editions Errance. 2nd edition, revised and augmented. 2003.
 James MacKillop, Dictionary of Celtic Mythology. Oxford University Press. 1998.
 Eoin MacNeill, Celtic Ireland. Academy Press. 1981 (reissue with new intro. and notes by Donnchadh Ó Corráin of original Martin Lester Ltd edition, 1921).
 Kuno Meyer (ed.), "The Laud Genealogies and Tribal Histories", in Zeitschrift für celtische Philologie 8 (1912): 291–338.
 Michael A. O'Brien (ed.) with intr. by John V. Kelleher, Corpus genealogiarum Hiberniae. DIAS. 1976. / partial digital edition: Donnchadh Ó Corráin (ed.), Genealogies from Rawlinson B 502. University College, Cork: Corpus of Electronic Texts. 1997.
 T. F. O'Rahilly, Early Irish History and Mythology. Dublin Institute for Advanced Studies. 1946.
 Julius Pokorny, "Beiträge zur ältesten Geschichte Irlands (3. Érainn, Dári(n)ne und die Iverni und Darini des Ptolomäus)", in Zeitschrift für celtische Philologie 12 (1918): 323–57.
 Whitley Stokes (ed. & tr.), "Cóir Anmann (Fitness of Names)", in Whitley Stokes and Ernst Windisch, Irische Texte mit Wörterbuch. Volume 3, Parts 1–2. Leipzig: Verlag von S. Hirzel. 1891 (1); 1897 (2). pp. 285–444. alternative scan I alternative scan II

Dictionary of the Irish Language
 eDIL – Dictionary of the Irish Language Letter: D1 (D-Degóir), Columns 34 through 36

Irish-language masculine given names
Ancient Ireland
Legendary High Kings of Ireland